"Wasted" is a song written by Chesney Hawkes and Jens Thoresen, and recorded by American singer Jennifer Paige. It was released in March 2008 as the first single from her studio album Best Kept Secret.

Track listing

 CD single
Wasted — 3:37
Mercy — 4:08

Music video

Chart

References

2008 singles
Jennifer Paige songs
2008 songs
Songs written by Chesney Hawkes